FC ViOn Zlaté Moravce is a Slovak football team, based in the town of Zlaté Moravce. The club was founded on 22 January 1995. During the 2014/15 campaign they will be competing in the Slovak Super Liga.

Competitions

Slovak Super Liga

League table

Matches

Slovak Cup

References

External links 

  

FC ViOn Zlaté Moravce seasons
ViOn Zlate Moravce